Moserhof is a traditional inn located in Gumpoldskirchen town, Austria and founded in 1437.

In 2012 it was renovated and visitors can select modern or traditional room decoration. Nearby are local tourist attractions Church St. Michael, Town Hall, etc.

See also 
List of oldest companies

References

External links 
Homepage

Hotels in Austria
Restaurants in Austria
Companies established in the 15th century
15th-century establishments in Austria
Economy of Lower Austria